The Court of the Council in the Dominion and Principality of Wales, and the Marches of the same, commonly called the Council of Wales and the Marches or the Council of the Marches, was a regional administrative body based in Ludlow Castle within the Kingdom of England between the 15th and 17th centuries, similar to the Council of the North. Its area of responsibility varied but generally covered all of modern Wales and the Welsh Marches of Shropshire, Herefordshire, Worcestershire, Cheshire and Gloucestershire. The City of Bristol was exempted in 1562, and Cheshire in 1569.

History

15th century
The Council was initially responsible for governing the lands held under the Principality of Wales, the lands directly administered by the English Crown following the Edwardian conquest of Wales in the 13th century. In 1457, King Henry VI created for his son, Prince Edward, a Council to rule Wales and the Marches, Cheshire, and Cornwall.

It was re-established by Edward IV of England as a body to counsel and act on behalf of his son, the infant Edward, Prince of Wales. King Edward had recently been restored to the monarchy during the Wars of the Roses, and he and his allies controlled most of the marcher lordships within and adjoining Wales. He established his son at Ludlow Castle, and appointed his allies from the Woodville and Stanley families as leading figures in the Council.

16th century
The Council continued after the death of Edward IV and the disappearance of his son. Under Henry VII, the Council was responsible for acting on behalf of his sons as successive Princes of Wales, first Arthur and then Henry.

The second Laws in Wales Act of 1542 gave the Council statutory recognition; it had previously been based solely upon the king's prerogative. The full Council was composed of the Lord President and his deputy, with twenty members nominated by the king; these included members of the royal household, some of the bishops of Wales, and the justices of the Court of Great Sessions. It continued to sit at Ludlow, and had responsibilities for the whole of Wales together with the Welsh Marches. These were initially deemed to comprise Cheshire, Shropshire, Herefordshire, Worcestershire and Gloucestershire; the City of Bristol was exempted in 1562, and Cheshire in 1569. Worcestershire unsuccessfully attempted to free itself in 1576, and the Council's authority over the English counties was relaxed in 1606 but restored by royal decree in 1609.

The legislation which gave statutory recognition to the Council did not specify its role, but declared that the President and Council should have power to hear and determine "such Causes and Matters as be or heretofore hath been accustomed and used". However, its functions were interpreted widely. It was to hear all suits, civil and criminal, which were brought by individuals too poor to sue at common law; it was to try all cases of murder, felony, piracy, wrecking, and such crimes as were likely to disturb the peace; it was to investigate charges of misgovernment by officials and the false verdicts of juries; it was to enforce the laws against livery and maintenance, to punish rumour mongers and adulterers, and to deal with disputes concerning enclosures, villein service, and manorial questions; it heard appeals from the common law courts; and it was responsible for administering the legislation dealing with religion. A leading figure was Sir Henry Sidney, President of the Council from 1560 to 1586. According to historian John Davies, at its peak under Sidney and for a period thereafter the Council "represented a remarkable experiment in regional government. It administered the law cheaply and rapidly; it dealt with up to twenty cases a day and George Owen stated that the 'oppressed poor' flocked to it."

17th century
The Council was abolished on 25 July 1689, following the Glorious Revolution of 1688 which overthrew James II and established William III (William of Orange) and Mary II as joint monarchs. According to Davies, "when the Council at Ludlow was abolished... there was very little protest in Wales. Instead, the Welsh gentry embraced London".

Presidents of the Council
The following served as Presidents of the Council: 
1473–1500: Bishop John Alcock 
c.1501–1512: Bishop William Smyth 
1512–1525: Bishop Geoffrey Blyth 
1525–1534: Bishop John Vesey 
1534–1543: Bishop Rowland Lee 
1543–1549: Bishop Richard Sampson 
1549–1550: John Dudley, Earl of Warwick 
1550–1553: William Herbert, 1st Earl of Pembroke 
1553–1555: Bishop Nicholas Heath 
1555–1558: William Herbert, 1st Earl of Pembroke 
1558–1559: Bishop Gilbert Bourne 
1559: John Williams, 1st Baron Williams de Thame 
1560–1586: Sir Henry Sidney 
1586–1601: Henry Herbert, 2nd Earl of Pembroke 
1601 (acting?): Sir Richard Lewknor 
1602–1607: Edward la Zouche, 11th Baron Zouche 
1607–1616: Ralph Eure, 3rd Baron Eure 
1616–1617: Thomas Gerard, 1st Baron Gerard 
1617–1630: William Compton, 1st Earl of Northampton 
1631–1642: John Egerton, 1st Earl of Bridgewater
1660–1672: Richard Vaughan, 2nd Earl of Carbery 
1672–1689: Henry Somerset, 1st Duke of Beaufort 
1689: Charles Gerard, 1st Earl of Macclesfield

Vice-Presidents of the Council
The following served as Vice-Presidents of the Council:
1550–1551: Sir James Croft 
1559: Hugh Paulet
1562–1576: Sir William Gerard 
1565–1569: John Throckmorton
1569–1571: Sir Hugh Cholmondeley
1575–1577: Andrew Corbet 
1577–1580: Bishop John Whitgift
1605–?: Gervase Babington 

In addition, from 1542 the Justice of Chester (from 1578 the Chief Justice of Chester) often acted as a de facto Vice-President of the Council, without formally holding the title.

See also
Council of the North
Council of the West

References

Bibliography

 

 

 
 
 

Politics of Wales
Government of Wales
1689 disestablishments
History of Cheshire
History of Herefordshire
History of Monmouthshire
History of Shropshire
History of Worcestershire
Medieval Wales
1472 establishments in England
Stuart England
Tudor England
History of Ludlow
Legal history of Wales
Principality of Wales